Sittin' on Somethin' Phat is the debut album by American rapper and producer, Ant Banks.

Track listing 
"2 the Head"
"Late Nite Fuck"
"Roll 'em Phat"
"U Just a Punk"
"Livin' the Life"
"Sittin' on Somethin' Phat"
"Lyin' on Yo Dick" (featuring Mhisani)
"Spice 1 wit da Banksta" (featuring Spice 1)
"Only Out to Fuck" (featuring Too Short, Pooh-Man and Mhisani)
"Hit It"
"The End"

Samples
Livin' the Life
"Never, Never Gonna Give You Up" by Barry White
Hit It
"Hit It and Quit It" by Funkadelic
"Nappy Dugout" by Funkadelic
Roll 'Em Phat
"Genius of Love" by Tom Tom Club

Chart positions

References 

1993 debut albums
Ant Banks albums
Jive Records albums
Albums produced by Ant Banks